Jeevansathi.com is an Indian matrimonial portal owned by Info Edge.

Etymology
"Jeevan" means "life" and "sathi" means "friend" or "partner"; hence, "Jeevansathi" means "life partner".

Overview
The website was bought in 2004 by Info Edge Ltd.

The website has more than 61 Lakh (6.1 million) registered members as of March 31, 2014.

The organisation has around 230 employees working in 54 offices in 37 cities spread across the country, headquartered in Noida, India. Jeevansathi also has 14 Matchpoint across India. It is listed in Bombay Stock Exchange.

History
October 1998, Sanjeev Bikhchandani, founder and executive vice chairman of Info Edge India, started the matrimonial website. The website was developed by Anil Lall, the head of Info Edge's technology department. The services were free in the initial years.

Auditing services were done by the Amit and Rohit Tandon. The founder, Sanjeev explained the conditions of ICICI Ventures. During the conversation, it came out that auditors were interested in opening a dotcom company. The website was then sold to Amit and Rohit Tandon, with Sanjeev Bikhchandani keeping 35 percent stakes. The company under the ownership of Tandon brothers did well with getting traffic and revenues.

 In 2004, Info Edge bought back Jeevansathi.
 In 2008, Jeevansathi.com introduced a new feature which allowed prospects to chat with their prospective life partner on google talk with complete confidentiality.
 In 2011, Jeevansathi became one of the preferred matrimonial websites in North India. 	 
 In 2012-13, The website had 5.6 million registered profiles.
 In 2014, Jeevansathi launched its Android app.
 In 2014, Jeevansathi participated the Great Online Shopping Festival.

Business model
Jeevansathi.com uses the customer to customer (C2C) business model. The website has free list, search, and express interest and accepts other expressions of interest. Users have to pay get contact details. There are also offline centers operational for matching services. Jeevansathi.com Match Point centers provides offline users with matchmaking services.  The first center was launched in Mumbai in 2008.

Jeevansathi.com became profitable for the first time during the first quarter of 2016-17, earning ₹65 lakh before interest and taxes. Its revenue grew 34% year-on-year from ₹10.9 crore to ₹14.6 crore in FY 2016-17.

Awards and recognition 
In 2010, the website received a silver award at the Radio Advertising Awards category for its "In Sawalon se muhje bachhao" radio campaign, a contest to find the most bizarre matchmaking questions they'd come across.

In 2016, its "Be Found" campaign won a bronze award in the "Services: Other" category of The Advertising Club's EFFIE awards.

See also 
 Shaadi.com
 BharatMatrimony
 Matrimony.com

References

External links 

Indian matrimonial websites